Adam Glyn (born April 5, 1984) is a comedian and was a TMZ camera guy. He is from Union, New Jersey. He appeared on TMZ on TV as the NYC camera guy since 2010 and has hosted the game show South of Wilshire (2016), produced by TMZ's Harvey Levin. Adam currently co-hosts the Hollywood Raw Podcast.

Early life and education 
Adam was born on April 5, 1984, and grew up in Union, New Jersey, and graduated from Kean University in 2006. Adam Glyn's youthful look is only disguised by his scope and depth in the comedy scene. A native New Jersian, Adam's humor has expanded from coast to coast. He has opened for such modern day comic icons such as D.L. Hughley, Shawn Wayans, and Artie Lange from the Howard Stern Show. On the small screen, Adam has appeared on MTV Hits, Total Request Live, and quickly became a favorite correspondent for the MTV networks. His quick wit and humor quickly transcended him as a frequent guest on the Maxim Radio as well as The Howard Stern Show on SiriusXM Satellite Radio.

Career 

Adam is best known for TMZ where he was an Emmy Nominated Senior Field Producer but he started his career as an intern for The Howard Stern Show in 2005. In 2016, he started the Conor McGregor vs Floyd Mayweather fight, which earned him respect from the fighting community. He has also appeared as a guest on various shows such as Good Day New York and Dish Nation talking about TMZ, celeb gossip and his game show. He interviewed the biggest politicians, musicians, actors, athletes, and social influencers in the world. Oprah Winfrey, Donald Trump, Jimmy Carter, Tony Robbins, Tim Ferris, Floyd Mayweather, Conor McGregor, Shaquille O'Neal, David Letterman, Beyonce, Stevie Wonder, Kevin Hart, Alec Baldwin, Usher, Rihanna, Ronda Rousey, and many many more. Beyonce put him in her music video for the hit song, "XO." Shaquille O'Neal is known for picking him up wherever he is, putting him in his car, and making him hang with him for the day. Widely cited for his journalism in the 2014 "Ray Rice news conference" with NFL Commissioner Roger Goodell, making the Yale Public Library for #4 Quote of 2014.

Stand-Up Comedian 
Since 2004, Adam has performed all over the country at clubs, colleges, and casinos. Opened for Artie Lange, D.L. Hughley, Joel McHale, among others. The Star Ledger boasted Adam as "one comic to definitely to keep an eye on as his humor and energy light up a room."

TMZ 
From 2010 to 2017 Adam was the main TMZ and TMZ on TV camera guy from NYC. He interviewed celebrities in all facets of entertainment/politics including: actors, singers, musicians, directors, professional athletes, writers, news correspondents, and politicians. Some of his more famous encounters include Beyonce (he appeared in her music video from Coney Island), Shaquille O'Neal, and Lana Del Rey. He's played Rock-Paper-Scissors with Usher, sang "Dreidel, Dreidel, Dreidel" with Michael Buble, got Stevie Wonder to fill in for him behind the camera and has gotten kidnapped by his friend Shaquille O'Neal. "Adam has been one of the best photographers in the 10 years of TMZ. He's bright, personable and super inquisitive. Picking him was a no-brainer, and he really delivered."---- Quote by TMZ Czar Harvey Levin

South of Wilshire 
Adam hosted the TMZ-produced game show in 2016. It had an 8-week test run on some Fox owned affiliates including WWOR-TV in New York City. The game show was set at Dulan's, a soul food restaurant in the historically African-American Crenshaw District in Los Angeles. The show grew out of a dare undertaken by Harvey Levin to get his hair trimmed at an inner-city barbershop. Levin learned that a number of celebrities frequented the barbershop, and so he sent Glyn around to the restaurants, bars, churches, gyms and tattoo parlors in Compton, Inglewood and other less-than-glitzy neighborhoods to discover other secret celebrity haunts. Glyn interviews the owners about their clientele, then plays the edited video packages for the "South of Wilshire" contestants, who must guess the identify of the star.

Hollywood Raw Podcast 
In 2018, Adam joined Dax Holt as co-host of the Hollywood Raw Podcast. Together, they interview celebrities such as reality TV stars, political figures, social media influencers, and more, as well as cover the latest in entertainment news. Hollywood Raw is currently one of the top podcasts from the Hurrdat Media Network, a digital media and commercial video production company based in Omaha, NE.

External links 
 Official website
 
Hollywood Raw Podcast

References 

1984 births
Living people
Comedians from New York City
Kean University alumni
21st-century American comedians